The Ferrari SF15-T is a Formula One racing car which Ferrari used to compete in the 2015 Formula One season. The chassis was designed by James Allison, Simone Resta and Dirk de Beer with Mattia Binotto leading the powertrain design. It was driven by Sebastian Vettel and Kimi Räikkönen. The SF15-T was launched on 30 January 2015. Carrying over his tradition from Red Bull and Toro Rosso, Vettel named his SF15-T "Eva" for the 2015 season.

Season summary
Team principal Maurizio Arrivabene had set the team a target of winning 2 races in the 2015 season. Vettel won the  after capitalising on an early safety car. Räikkönen came home in fourth place after suffering a puncture following contact with another car in the early stages of the race. In Bahrain, Räikkönen had his best showing yet coming home in 2nd place. He capitalised on Vettel's troubles and Nico Rosberg's brake by wire issues.

A second win was achieved in Hungary, when Vettel overtook the two Mercedes cars at the start, and led for the majority of the race. Vettel took his first pole for Ferrari and the team's first for three years – since the 2012 German Grand Prix – in Singapore, ending the dominance of qualifying for Mercedes, since the dawn of the new Formula One turbo era. He then led the entire race, to take his and the team's third victory of the season with Räikkönen finishing third to record the team's first double podium finish for two years.

Ferrari finished the season 2nd in the Constructors' table with 428 points, nearly doubling their point total from the previous year. They proved to be the only true challenger to the dominant Mercedes team, as they were the only other team to win races. One minor consolation in the year was winning the inaugural DHL Fastest Pit Stop Award for completing the fastest pitstop in the most races during the season.

Complete Formula One results
(key) (results in bold indicate pole position; results in italics indicate fastest lap)

 Driver failed to finish the race, but was classified as they had completed greater than 90% of the race distance.

Other
The Ferrari SF15-T has been featured in the racing simulations F1 2015 and Assetto Corsa.

References

SF15-T
2015 Formula One season cars